Gibside is an estate in the Derwent Valley in North East England. It is between  Rowlands Gill, in Tyne and Wear, and Burnopfield, in County Durham, and a few miles from Newcastle-upon-Tyne. Gibside was previously owned by the Bowes-Lyon family. It is now a National Trust property. Gibside Hall, the main house on the estate, is now a shell, although the property is most famous for its chapel. The stables, walled garden, Column to Liberty and Banqueting House are also intact.

History
The Blakiston family acquired the estate by marriage in about 1540. Sir William Blakiston (1562–1641) replaced the old house with a spacious mansion between 1603 and 1620. Both the Royal (King James I of England) coat of arms and the Blakiston coat of arms are seen over the entrance of the old Hall. The Gibside property came into the possession of the Bowes family in 1713; a result of the marriage  in 1693 of Sir William's great-granddaughter, Elizabeth Blakiston, to Sir William Bowes (1657–1707) of Streatlam Castle (now demolished).

Until 1722, the basis of the Bowes' influence was their own estate and house of Streatlam Castle, County Durham. However, after that date the acquisition through marriage of the Blakiston estate of Gibside gave the Bowes family an even greater influence in the north of the county and a share in the immense wealth that was to be acquired from the coal trade. The Blakiston estate included some of the area's richest coal seams.

In 1767 the granddaughter of Sir William Bowes – the "Bowes heiress" Mary Eleanor Bowes – married John Lyon, 9th Earl of Strathmore and Kinghorne, who changed his surname to Bowes due to a provision in her father's will that any suitor had to take the family name. This was a device to continue the Bowes lineage in the absence of a male heir.

After the split inheritance dispute following the death of John Bowes, 10th Earl of Strathmore and Kinghorne, in 1820, it belonged to his legitimated son John Bowes until his death in 1885 (he is buried in the Gibside chapel), when under the entail it reverted to his cousin the 13th Earl of Strathmore and Kinghorne.  It had been the main residence of John Bowes' mother, Mary Milner, by then Dowager Countess of Strathmore, and her second husband, the politician Sir William Hutt (who had been John Bowes' tutor), and remained in his ownership until his death in 1882.

18th-century additions

Improvements to Gibside carried out by the Bowes-Lyon family in the 18th and early 19th centuries included landscaping, Gibside Chapel, built between 1760 and 1812, the Banqueting House, a column of Liberty, a substantial stable block, an avenue of oaks and several hundred acres of forest. The top floor of the main house was remodelled as a giant parapet in 1805.

The chapel reflects the Calvinist leanings of the family, and though nominally Anglican, the interior is dominated by a huge and centrally placed "three-decker" pulpit.  There is a house for the minister/chaplain nearby. Some holders of the position would not have been able to hold a Church of England parish living, on account of their views.  The leading Palladian architect James Paine is attributed with most of the work of the 1750s and 1760s.

The Banqueting House was built in 1746, and is an early example of Gothic Revival architecture, of the early form often called "Gothick".  It has now been restored and is available for letting by the Landmark Trust, who now own it.

Column to British Liberty

A large monument, originally called the "Column of British Liberty", now usually just the "Column to Liberty", was begun in the 1750s by the hugely wealthy Sir George Bowes, reflecting his Whig politics.  Set at the top of a steep hillock, the monument itself is a Doric order column, and topped by a standing bronze female figure, originally gilded, carrying a cap of liberty on a pole.

Later history
The Bowes-Lyon family had other major country houses, Glamis Castle in Scotland, and Streatlam Castle, County Durham, relatively close to Gibside.

The house became vacant in the 1920s after the Bowes-Lyon family sold some of its properties to pay death duties. The building was stripped of its fixtures and fittings, with many of the fireplaces and other items being transferred to Glamis Castle. Parts of the structure were demolished in 1958, including the removal of the roof.  What remains is protected by Grade II* listed building status and included in the Heritage at Risk Register.

Parts of the grounds have been designated a Site of Special Scientific Interest, including a forest garden.

The chapel and Long Walk have been in the National Trust's ownership since 1965, and an additional  of the grounds were acquired in 1993. The Banqueting House has been in the ownership of the Landmark Trust since 1981, the building having been restored from a derelict shell.  The stables now house a learning and discovery centre.

Women's Land Army girls were billeted at Gibside during World War I.

Gallery

References

External links

Gibside information at the National Trust
3D model of Gibside Chapel

Grade II listed buildings in Tyne and Wear
Country houses in Tyne and Wear
National Trust properties in Tyne and Wear
Sites of Special Scientific Interest in Tyne and Wear
Parks and open spaces in Tyne and Wear